Worldfund is a non-profit organization founded in 2002 that delivers training and ongoing support to teachers and principals from underserved schools in Latin America. It operates 3 different programs: LISTO, a principal leadership program, IAPE, an English-teacher training program and STEM Brasil, a science and math teacher training program. Nearly 8,000 principals and teachers have participated in Worldfund programming.

Programs

IAPE 

The Inter-American Partnership for Education (IAPE) trains, empowers, and supports a network of English language educators in Mexico's most underserved public schools, in association with Dartmouth College's Rassias Center. IAPE is in its tenth year of operation.

Impact by 2017 

 Launch year: 2007
 Number of states: 32/32
 Number of educators: 2,198
 Number of students: 2,100,000

STEM Brasil 
This program addresses the urgent increasing need for professionals in the fields of science, technology, engineering, and math. 
The STEM Brasil methodology complements the school curriculum. The program engages students with their own teachers during the school day, unlike extracurricular programs.

Impact by 2017 

 Launch year: 2009
 Number of states: 16/30
 Number of educators: 3,900
 Number of students: 500,000

Evaluation Results 

 85% of participating schools showed an increase of over 20% in Math scores 
 74% of school administrators noticed an increase in teacher motivation and 88% positive changes in teacher behavior

STEM Mexico 

Worldfund is currently developing the infrastructure to implement its STEM program within Mexico's public schools. Anticipated launch date is 2018.

Areas of Operation

Mexico 
 México
 Ciudad de México	
 Veracruz	
 Jalisco	
 Puebla	
 Guanajuato	
 Chiapas	
 Nuevo León	
 Michoacán	
 Oaxaca	
 Chihuahua	
 Guerrero	
 Tamaulipas	
 Baja California	
 Sinaloa	
 Coahuila de Zaragoza	
 Hidalgo	
 Sonora	
 San Luis Potosí	
 Tabasco	
 Yucatán	
 Querétaro de Arteaga	
 Morelos	
 Durango	
 Zacatecas	
 Quintana Roo	
 Aguascalientes	
 Tlaxcala	
 Nayarit	
 Campeche	
 Baja California Sur	
 Colima

Brazil 
 Acre
 Amapá
 Espírito Santo
 Goiás
 Maranhão
 Mato Grosso
 Mato Grosso do Sul
 Paraíba
 Pernambuco
 Rio de Janeiro
 Rio Grande do Norte
 Rio Grande do Sul
 Rondônia
 São Paulo
 Sergipe 
 Tocantins

References

External links
"Dartmouth-based partnership aims to help English teaching in Latin America" (6.21.2007 Article from The Dartmouth)
"Spreading English Throughout The World" (7.6.2007 WCAX TV News Item)
"Mexican teachers learn Rassias Method" (7.26.2007 Article from The Dartmouth)
Worldfund's relationship with Better World Books

Non-profit organizations based in New York City